Channel 12 or TV12 may refer to:

 YSWX, Channel 12 (El Salvador), a television channel in El Salvador
 Channel 12 (Israel), a television channel in Israel
 TV Tokyo, a television station in Tokyo, Japan
 Canal 12 (Nicaragua), a television channel in Nicaragua
 MediaCorp TV12, a Singapore company that operates three television channels
 Canal 12 Teledoce,  a television channel in Uruguay
 THVL (old), CTV12, a Television channel in Vietnam

See also
 Channel 12 branded TV stations in the United States
 Channel 12 virtual TV stations in Canada
 Channel 12 virtual TV stations in Mexico
 Channel 12 virtual TV stations in the United States

For VHF frequencies covering 204-210 MHz:
 Channel 12 TV stations in Canada
 Channel 12 TV stations in Mexico
 Channel 12 digital TV stations in the United States
 Channel 12 low-power TV stations in the United States

12